Martyn Saunders (born 16 May 1958) was an English first-class cricketer who played three first-class games for Worcestershire in 1980. He was born in Worcester.

Saunders played for Worcestershire's Second XI as early as 1976, but had to wait four years before making his first-team debut, against Lancashire in the only first-class match ever played at Stourport-on-Severn. Worcestershire recorded a crushing innings victory, but Saunders' only contribution of note was to remove opposing captain Frank Hayes as Lancashire followed on.

After a further spell in the second team, Saunders was selected for the last two County Championship matches of the 1980 season. Against Kent he claimed five wickets, three of them Test players: Chris Cowdrey (twice), Mark Benson and Alan Knott. However, Cowdrey's wicket in the second innings was to be Saunders' last: against Nottinghamshire he went wicketless; he never played again.

External links
 

1958 births
Living people
English cricketers
Worcestershire cricketers